Chile competed in the 2019 Pan American Games in Lima, Peru from July 26 to August 11, 2019.

On July 1, 2019, water skier Felipe Miranda was named as the country's flag bearer during the opening ceremony.

The Chilean team consisted of 317 athletes.

Santiago will host the next Pan American Games in 2023. The Chilean segment was performed at the closing ceremony.

Medalists

The following Chilean competitors won medals at the games.

|  style="text-align:left; width:78%; vertical-align:top;"|

|  style="text-align:left; width:26%; vertical-align:top;"|

Competitors
The following is the list of number of competitors (per gender) participating at the games per sport/discipline.

Archery

Men

Women

Mixed

Artistic swimming

Chile qualified a duet of two athletes.

Women

Badminton

Chile qualified a team of four badminton athletes (two per gender).

Men

Women

Mixed

Basque pelota

Men

Women

Beach volleyball

Chile qualified four beach volleyball athletes (two men and two women).

Men

Women

Bodybuilding

Chile qualified a full team of two bodybuilders.

There were no results in the pre-judging stage, with only the top six advancing.

Boxing

Chile qualified one male boxer.

Men

Canoeing

Slalom
Chile qualified a total of three slalom athletes (one man and two women).

Sprint
Chile qualified a total of 8 sprint athletes (two men and six women).

Men

Women

Qualification legend: QF – Qualify to final; SF – Qualify to semifinal

Diving

Men

Women

Equestrian

Chile qualified a full team of 12 equestrians (four per discipline).

Dressage

Eventing

Jumping

Fencing

Chile qualified a team of 3 male fencers.

Men
Épée – 1 quota
Foil – 1 quota
Sabre – 1 quota

Field hockey

Chile qualified a men's and women's team (of 16 athletes each, for a total of 32). The men qualified by being ranked second at the 2018 South American Games. The women's team qualified by being ranked as one of the top three nations not already qualified from the 2017 Women's Pan American Cup.

Men's tournament

Preliminary round

Quarter-finals

Semi-finals

Bronze medal match

Women's tournament

Preliminary round

Quarter-finals

Semi-finals

Bronze medal match

Golf

Chile qualified a full team of four golfers (two men and two women).

Gymnastics

Artistic
Chile qualified two male gymnasts and a team of five female gymnasts.

Men
Individual Qualification

Qualification Legend: Q = Qualified to apparatus final   R# = Reserve for the final 

Individual Finals

Women
Team & Individual Qualification

Qualification Legend: Q = Qualified to apparatus final

Individual Finals

Trampoline
Chile qualified a one male trampolinist.

Handball

Chile qualified a men's team of 14 athletes.

Men's tournament
Pool stage

Semifinals

Final

Modern pentathlon

Chile qualified three modern pentathletes (two men and one woman).

Racquetball

Chile qualified three racquetball athletes (one man and two women).

Men

Women

Rugby sevens

Men's tournament
Pool stage

5th-8th classification

5th place match

Sailing

Men

Women

Mixed

Open

Shooting

Men

Women

Mixed

Squash

Chile nominated 6 tennis players (3 men and 3 women) to compete in the tournament.

Men

Women

Mixed

Teams

Surfing

Chile qualified five surfers (two men and three women) in the sport's debut at the Pan American Games.

Artistic

Race

Swimming

Chile qualified nine swimmers (five men and four women).

Men

Women

Table tennis

Men

Women

Mixed

Taekwondo

Kyorugi (sparring)
Men

Women

Tennis

Chile nominated 6 tennis players (3 men and 3 women) to compete in the tournament.

Men

Women

Mixed

Triathlon

Mixed relay

Volleyball

Chile qualified a men's volleyball team, consisting of 12 athletes.

Semifinals

Bronze medal match

Weightlifting

Chile qualified five weightlifters (two men and three women).

Wrestling

Men

See also
Chile at the 2020 Summer Olympics

References

Nations at the 2019 Pan American Games
2019
2019 in Chilean sport